Anna Banks is an American author, best known for her New York Times best selling Syrena Legacy series. Mad Hatter Entertainment, producer on the How to Train Your Dragon franchise, has acquired movie rights to her Syrena Legacy series.

Published works

The Syrena Legacy 
Of Poseidon, 2012
Of Triton, 2013
Of Neptune, 2014
Syrena Legacy Stories:
"Legacy Lost" (series prequel), 2012
"The Stranger", 2013
"Girls Day Out", 2014

Young Adult 
Joyride, 2016
Nemesis, 2016
Ally (sequel to Nemesis), 2017

Romance 
 How To Lose A Bachelor, 2015

References

External links 
 

Living people
21st-century American novelists
American women novelists
Year of birth missing (living people)
21st-century American women writers
People from Niceville, Florida
People from Crestview, Florida
American young adult novelists
American fantasy writers
Women writers of young adult literature
Women science fiction and fantasy writers
Novelists from Florida